Rybno may refer to the following places:
Rybno, Kuyavian-Pomeranian Voivodeship (north-central Poland)
Rybno, Sochaczew County in Masovian Voivodeship (east-central Poland)
Rybno, Podlaskie Voivodeship (north-east Poland)
Rybno, Wyszków County in Masovian Voivodeship (east-central Poland)
Rybno, Gniezno County in Greater Poland Voivodeship (west-central Poland)
Rybno, Koło County in Greater Poland Voivodeship (west-central Poland)
Rybno, Konin County in Greater Poland Voivodeship (west-central Poland)
Rybno, Silesian Voivodeship (south Poland)
Rybno, Lubusz Voivodeship (west Poland)
Rybno, Pomeranian Voivodeship (north Poland)
Rybno, Działdowo County in Warmian-Masurian Voivodeship (north Poland)
Rybno, Mrągowo County in Warmian-Masurian Voivodeship (north Poland)